Kan Du Danse was Denmark's version of the dance competition show So You Think You Can Dance. The program was hosted by Thomas Mygind and Anne Katrine Skole and featured judges Niclas Bendixen, Toniah Pedersen and Kenneth Kretzman.  The show lasted two seasons and was ultimately succeeded in 2008 by So You Think You Can Dance Scandinavia, a joint So You Think You Can Dance venture including contestants from Denmark, Norway, and Sweden

Summary

Season 1 (2005)
Male Contestants

Female Contestants

Season 2 (2006)
The 2006 season began on September 14 on Kanal 5.

Contestants
 
Male contestants
Alex
Damian
Martin Dean
Patrick
Stephen F
Stephen K 
Suad
Female contestants
Camilla
Charlotte
Katinka
Kira
Nina
Sara

See also
So You Think You Can Dance Scandinavia
Dance on television

References

Danish reality television series
So You Think You Can Dance
2005 Danish television series debuts
2006 Danish television series endings
Dance competition television shows
2000s Danish television series
Danish television series based on American television series
Danish-language television shows
Kanal 5 (Danish TV channel) original programming